The 2008–09 season of the Botola, the first division of Moroccan football.

Table

Botola seasons
Morocco
1